

The Sheremetev Sh-5 (Шереметьев Ш-5) was a two-seat sailplane designed by Boris Nikolayevich Sheremetev and produced in the Soviet Union in the 1930s. It was an unorthodox design, with a pod-and-boom layout and a cruciform tail that had its horizontal stabiliser mounted atop the boom with a large ventral fin extending below it. The monoplane wing was mounted high, on a pylon above the fuselage pod, and braced to the fuselage with V-struts. Two open cockpits were provided in tandem, with the rear cockpit located beneath the wing. The landing gear consisted of a single sprung skid under the fuselage and a small tailwheel on the ventral fin.

The Sh-5 was also produced in Turkey as an unlicensed copy by THK as the THK-9 and subsequently by MKEK as the MKEK-7 when the latter company took over the production facilities of the former in 1952.

Specifications

Notes

References
 
 
 
 
 
 
 
 

1930s Soviet sailplanes
Sheremetev aircraft
Aircraft first flown in 1933